Marie Sarah van der Zyl  (née Kaye; born November 1965) is the 48th president of the Board of Deputies of British Jews. When she was elected in May 2018, she was only the second female president in the 258-year history of the organisation. She was  re-elected in May 2021.

Early life and career
She was born in the London Borough of Redbridge, the daughter of Barry Kaye, who was in tailoring, and his wife Szusanne, a beautician, and grew up in South Woodford, London, where she attended the local comprehensive school. She took a law degree at Liverpool Polytechnic (now Liverpool John Moores University). 

Specialising in employment law, she is a partner at Ince in London.

Board of Deputies of British Jews
Van der Zyl was initially a Deputy for the Jewish Lads' and Girls' Brigade. She took office as President on 1 June 2018, succeeding Jonathan Arkush, who did not seek re-election. She is the second ever woman and fourth lawyer in a row to hold the role. 

Her visits to her grandparents gave her, she says, "a great passion for Israel" and she believes that the Board exists "to promote a sympathetic understanding of Israel." She has pledged to "defend Israel’s legitimacy and its centrality to Jewish identity". She is a self-described "fighter" and takes as a compliment the comparison that "the only difference between me and a Rottweiler is that a Rottweiler eventually lets go".

In 2018, The Jerusalem Post ranked her as the 40th most influential Jew of that year.

Van der Zyl was appointed Officer of the Order of the British Empire (OBE) in the 2023 New Year Honours for services to faith and integration.

Other roles
Van der Zyl is an associate member of Mill Hill United Synagogue and has been a member of the management board of West London Synagogue. She is a trustee of the Jewish Leadership Council.

Personal life
Marie van der Zyl lives in Mill Hill, London. She has two daughters with her first husband, Darell van der Zyl, son of voice actress Nikki van der Zyl, whose father was Rabbi Werner van der Zyl. In September 2022 she married Adrian Cohen, a banking and finance lawyer, at West London Synagogue.

References

External links

Personal website
Board of Deputies profile

1965 births
Living people
21st-century English lawyers
Alumni of Liverpool John Moores University
English Jews
People from Woodford, London
Presidents of the Board of Deputies of British Jews
People from the London Borough of Redbridge
Marie
Officers of the Order of the British Empire
English solicitors